Maxsius Musa (born 21 May 1993) is a Malaysian professional footballer who plays as a winger for Malaysia Super League club Sabah.

Career statistics

Club

Honour
Sabah
Sukma: 2012 Gold
Malaysia Premier League: 2019

References

External links

1993 births
Living people
Malaysian footballers
People from Sabah
Sabah F.C. (Malaysia) players
Association football forwards
Malaysia Super League players